Light Fuse, Get Away is the first live album released by the Athens, GA based band Widespread Panic.  It was first released by Capricorn Records on April 12, 1998. It would later be re-released in 2001 by Zomba Music Group. The album was recorded over various concerts by the band in 1997. Pickin' Up The Pieces featured Branford Marsalis on saxophone and was recorded on September 7, 1997 in Boston.

On April 18, 1998, the band played a free live show in downtown Athens as part of their CD release party.  The concert was filmed and released on DVD and CD as Panic in the Streets According to the band, attendance was estimated at around 100,000 people. This in turn broke a previous record by Metallica for "largest record release party".

The album reached a peak position of #67 on the Billboard 200 chart.

Widespread Panic in the Streets of Athens, Georgia was released in April 2018 by University of Georgia Press. Marking the 20th anniversary of the legendary concert, the book explores the incredible history and legacy of the gig.

Track listing

Disc one
"Porch Song"  – 7:42
"Disco"  – 4:23
"Diner"  – 14:04
"Wondering"  – 4:24
"Love Tractor"  – 5:52
"Pilgrims"  – 8:35
"Space Wrangler"  – 9:00
"Travelin' Light" (Cale)  – 5:51
"Pickin' Up the Pieces"  – 5:30
"Conrad"  – 9:01

Disc two
"Papa Legba" (Byrne)  – 7:10
"Rebirtha"  – 7:51
"Rock"  – 6:33
"Greta"  – 10:44
"Barstools & Dreamers"  – 10:53
"Impossible/Jam"  – 10:51
"Drums"  – 6:25
"Gimme"  – 6:01
"Pigeons"  – 8:56

Personnel
Widespread Panic
 John Bell – guitar, vocals
 Michael Houser – guitar, vocals
 Todd Nance – percussion, drums, vocals
 Domingo S. Ortiz – percussion
 Dave Schools – bass, percussion, vocals
 John Hermann – keyboards

Technical
 John Keane – producer, mixing
 Brad Blettenburg – assistant engineer
 Billy Fields – assistant
 Frank Gargiulo – art direction
 Eve Kakassy – photography
 Ken Love – mastering
 Branford Marsalis – horn
 Thomas G. Smith – photography
 Jeremy Stein – photography
 Buck Williams – management
 Oade Brothers Audio – live audience tracks

References

External links
Widespread Panic website
Everyday Companion
[ All Music entry]

1998 live albums
Widespread Panic live albums
Capricorn Records live albums
Zomba Group of Companies albums
Albums produced by John Keane (record producer)